Walter Arlen (né Aptowitzer; born July 31, 1920) is an Austrian-born American composer, specializing mainly in voice and piano scores, having published around 65 works. He is also a music critic for the Los Angeles Times.

Biography

Arlen was born in Vienna. His parents ran a department store until it was taken from them by the Germans in 1938. His father was sent to Buchenwald concentration camp and his mother committed suicide after a breakdown. Arlen himself relocated to Chicago, and had a chance encounter with Schubert composer, Otto Erich Deutsch, and having promise was encouraged to compose, he records for Decca Records, with many of his works only discovered recently, having trained at the University of California, Los Angeles under Leo Sowerby and Roy Harris, he is being fundamental in tracking down other artists from the period whose works where lost or forgotten due to the Nazi Regime  Whilst working as a journalist, he founded the music department at Loyola University Chicago. Arlen established friendships with numerous other German and Austrian emigrees, including Stravinsky, Milhaud, Villa-Lobos and Chavez

Selected works and recordings
Recordings:
Klavierwerke & Lieder Rebecca Nelsen (soprano), Daniel Wnukowski (piano) 2 CDs Gramola
Kammermusik & Lieder "Die letzte Blaue",  Rebecca Nelsen, Christian Immler, Daniel Wnukowski, Daniel Hope 2 CDs Gramola
Lieder "Es geht wohl anders",   Rebecca Nelsen, Christian Immler, Danny Driver 2 CDs Gramola

References

1920 births
20th-century American composers
20th-century American Jews
20th-century Austrian composers
20th-century American LGBT people
21st-century American composers
21st-century American Jews
21st-century LGBT people
American centenarians
American male composers
American music critics
American music educators
American people of Austrian-Jewish descent
Austrian centenarians
Austrian composers
Austrian emigrants to the United States
Austrian male composers
Austrian music critics
Austrian music educators
Jewish American composers
LGBT composers
Living people
Men centenarians